The Wild Chase is a Warner Bros. Merrie Melodies short directed by Friz Freleng and Hawley Pratt. The short was released on February 27, 1965, and stars Speedy Gonzales and Sylvester, with Wile E. Coyote and the Road Runner along for the race. This cartoon was the only Wile E. Coyote/Road Runner cartoon to be directed by Freleng or Pratt, who specialized in Speedy and Sylvester cartoons. It is also noted as a crossover between the Sylvester/Speedy and Coyote/Road Runner cartoons.

This is the only Speedy Gonzales short to feature Wile E. Coyote and the Road Runner, and the final time Speedy appears with Sylvester the Cat. This is also the final classic era cartoon to be directed by Friz Freleng.

The cartoon largely consists of reused animation and gags from previous Coyote/Road Runner cartoons.

Plot
Speedy Gonzales, the fastest mouse in all Mexico, races against the Road Runner, the Texas road burner, in the USA - Mexico border zone. During the race, Sylvester the Cat and Wile E. Coyote join forces in an attempt to catch their speedy opponents, with predictable results. Often they mistakenly end up injuring each other in comical fashion.

1. As the race starts, Wile E. chases after the Road Runner, only to run into a cloud of dust and fall off the cliff (reusing animation from Zoom and Bored). Sylvester tries the same thing, only to find Speedy on the other side of the cliff, before the Road Runner scares him off the cliff.

2. As the racers are coming, Wile E. and Sylvester catapult rocks to flatten them, but this backfires when the rocks crash into each other and land on their owners instead.

3. The duo then places iron pellets under bird seed and slices of cheese; while the racers eat, the two attach a grenade to a roller skate with a magnet, but only the magnet part of the roller skate leaves and when Wile E. checks it (as he doesn't want Sylvester to check), the grenade blows up in his face (A scene reused from Wild About Hurry).

4. More reused Wild About Hurry animation is seen as Wile E. rolls a flat rock to flatten the racers, but the rock does not move - it stays on the edge of the cliff. Wile E. attempts to make it drop, but it still does not move. Sylvester comes to help and they both jump up and down on it, then the rock finally drops the two of them off the cliff.

5. The duo decide to blow a culvert as the racers are coming, but as Wile E. is placing the dynamite and Sylvester is watching from the tunnel, it explodes on them. This reuses a gag from Hopalong Casualty.

6. One more idea from Wild About Hurry finds the duo using a rocket car to chase Speedy and the Road Runner, but they zoom past them and technically finish first to win the race. However, they do not get the trophy as the only contestants were Speedy and the Road Runner. Sylvester and Wile E. then fly up into the air and the rocket car explodes into a firework as the end card fades in.

Crew
 Co-Director: Hawley Pratt
 Story: Friz Freleng, John Dunn 
 Animation: Norm McCabe, Don Williams, Manny Perez, Warren Batchelder, Laverne Hardling
 Layout: Dick Ung
 Backgrounds: Tom O'Loughlin
 Film Editor: Lee Gunther
 Voice Characterizations: Mel Blanc
 Music: Bill Lava
 Produced by: David H. DePatie and Friz Freleng
 Directed by: Friz Freleng

References

External links
 The Wild Chase at Internet Movie Database

Merrie Melodies short films
Warner Bros. Cartoons animated short films
Short films directed by Friz Freleng
Wile E. Coyote and the Road Runner films
1965 animated films
Films scored by William Lava
DePatie–Freleng Enterprises short films
1965 short films
Animated films about mice
Animated films about cats
Animated films about birds
1960s Warner Bros. animated short films
1960s English-language films
American animated short films
Films about Canis
Speedy Gonzales films
Sylvester the Cat films
American comedy short films